Marc J. Rochkind invented the Source Code Control System while working at Bell Labs, as well as writing Advanced UNIX Programming, and founding XVT Software, Inc.

References

External links
 Marc Rochkind's web site

American computer scientists
Unix people
Living people
Year of birth missing (living people)
Place of birth missing (living people)